Vemb-Lemvig-Thyborøn Jernbane (VLTJ) or Lemvigbanen is a Danish railway line in Northwest Jutland. Established in 1879, the line extends from Vemb via Lemvig to Thyborøn. The single-track line is mostly level, and is operated with a fleet of five double-unit Y-train railcars. VLTJ has its own workshop and servicing facilities on the line.

Until 1 January 2008, the line was operated by the company Vemb-Lemvig-Thyborøn Jernbane A/S, which has been merged with Odderbanen's operating company to form Midtjyske Jernbaner.

The railway was used to test a prototype hydrogen-powered train in 2010.

Popular culture 
The railway achieved fame in Denmark, when the band Tørfisk in 1985 wrote the song "VLTJ" describing a trip with the railway. This song later achieved cult status.
The song is based on the Irish folk song "Poor Paddy works on the Railway".

See also
 Rail transport in Denmark
 List of railway lines in Denmark

References

External links
 Official website

Photos
 VLTJ at The Railfaneurope.net Picture Gallery

Railway companies established in 1879
Railway lines in Denmark
Railway stations in Denmark opened in the 19th century